The Battle of Kletsk was a battle fought on 5 August 1506 near Kletsk (now in Belarus), between the Grand Ducal Lithuanian army, led by Court Marshal of Lithuania Michael Glinski, and the army of the Crimean Khanate, led by Fetih I Giray and Burnaş I Giray, sons of the Khan of Crimea, Meñli I Giray. The battle was one of the first and greatest Lithuanian victories over the Tatars.

Background
The Lithuanians had allied themselves with Hacı I Giray, founder of the Crimean Khanate. However, in the 1480s his son Meñli I Giray, who came to power with Ottoman help, allied himself with the Grand Duchy of Moscow, a long-standing enemy of the Grand Duchy of Lithuania. The Lithuanians then allied with the Golden Horde and its remnant Great Horde, which were the Crimean Khanate's enemies. During the Muscovite–Lithuanian War of 1503, the Crimean Tatar armies pillaged the Lithuania's southern towns of Slutsk, Kletsk, and Nyasvizh and even threatened the capital city of Vilnius. Alexander Jagiellon, Grand Duke of Lithuania, then ordered the construction of a defensive wall around his capital, which was completed in 1522. In August 1505, Meñli I Giray sent his eldest son to plunder the territories of Minsk, Polotsk, Vitebsk, and Novogrudok. It was not only a raid for slaves and loot, but also for political pressure to execute imprisoned Sheikh Ahmed, the last Khan of the Great Horde.

Simultaneously, conflicts emerged within the Lithuanian Council of Lords between the quickly-rising Michael Glinski and Jan Zabrzeziński. In summer 1506, Grand Duke Alexander's health deteriorated and he decided to convene a Seimas in Lida so that he could transfer the Lithuanian throne to his brother Sigismund I. But the convention was disrupted on 25 July by news of a Tatar invasion. According to scout reports, about 20,000 Tatars looted the area around the city of Slutsk and approached Novogrudok and Lida. The raid started at the end of May. At Loyew they crossed the river Dnieper and around July 20–22 established their main camp at Kletsk – the town was devastated by them in 1503 and posed no serious threat. Alexander left for Vilnius after putting Stanisław Kiszka, Great Hetman of Lithuania, and Glinski in charge of the defense.

Battle
The Lithuanians quickly gathered 7,000 men in Novogrudok. Meanwhile, the Tatars sent half of their force in smaller groups to pillage surrounding areas. The march exhausted Kiszka, who fell ill; command of the Lithuanian army passed to Glinski. Though Glinski was of Tatar roots, he had fought in the Italian Wars and other conflicts in western Europe.

The Tatar camp lay in a strong defensive position between the Lan River and its tributary Tsapra. The Tatars were warned of the approaching Lithuanian army and were ready for battle. Apparently, they decided against trying to outrun the approaching army to protect their slaves and loot. Glinski, on the other hand, wanted to destroy the Tatar army, not merely push it back to Crimea. The heavy Lithuanian cavalry could not cross the rivers and their swampy banks. Therefore, Glinski split his army in half, so that he might attack the Tatars from two sides and block retreat routes, and built two pontoon bridges across the rivers as the combatants exchanged artillery fire.

However, Glinski's political rival Jan Zabrzeziński did not trust Glinski's command and, against orders, attacked the Tatars as soon as one of the bridges was completed on 5 August. The small detachments of Zabrzeziński's men were quickly defeated and the Tatars mockingly displayed their severed heads. This enraged the right wing of the Lithuanian army, which promptly attacked in full force. That prompted the Tatars to concentrate their full force against the Lithuanian right wing, leaving only weak defenses against the Lithuanian left wing, which delayed its attack. When Glinski led the left wing forward to the assault, the Lithuanians easily broke through the defenses and attacked the main Tatar forces from the rear. The Tatar army was split in half: one half was surrounded and defeated while the other retreated.

The Lithuanians pursued the retreating Tatars; it was said that more Tatars died retreating across the Tsapra than in the battle. The Lithuanians achieved a victory and recovered much booty (gold, silver, horses) and many prisoners taken by the Tatars. Remnants of Tatar forces were defeated by locals at Slutsk, Zhytomyr, Ovruch. For a few more days, the Lithuanians waited for Tatar contingents returning to the camp from pillaging Lithuanian villages and countryside.

Aftermath
On 12 August 1506, victorious Michael Glinski entered Vilnius. In honor of the victory, Mikołaj II Radziwiłł sponsored the construction of the Church of Saint George on the Neris riverbank. But when Grand Duke Alexander Jagiellon died on 19 August, Zabrzeziński accused Glinski of having conspired to murder the dead ruler. Glinski fell from royal favor and began an anti-Lithuanian revolt, murdering Zabrzeziński and allying with the Grand Duchy of Moscow. The Glinski rebellion became part of the renewed Muscovite–Lithuanian War.

Khan Meñli I Giray of Crimea hurried to assure Alexander Jagiellon that the raid was unauthorized and asked to maintain peace. Crimean Khanate severed its long-standing alliance with Moscow due to, among other things, the Muscovite campaign against the Khanate of Kazan. Lithuanian Grand Duke Sigismund I received an iarlyk for the Russian territories of Novgorod, Pskov, and Ryazan.

References

Kleck
1506 in Lithuania
Kletsk
Kletsk
Kletsk
Military history of Belarus